This is a list of animals that represent first-level administrative country subdivisions.

List by country

Australia

Brazil
 See also List of Brazilian state birds

Canada

People's Republic of China

India

Indonesia

Italy

Japan

Netherlands

Malaysia

Mexico

Pakistan

Philippines

Romania

South Korea

Spain

Sweden

United Kingdom

United States

See also
 Floral emblem
 List of national birds
 National emblem

References

Animal
Animals
 First-level administrative country subdivisions, Animals representing
Representing first-level administrative country subdivisions